The 1988 Boston College Eagles football team represented Boston College as an independent during the 1988 NCAA Division I-A football season. The Eagles were led by eighth-year head coach Jack Bicknell, and played their home games at Alumni Stadium in Chestnut Hill, Massachusetts. On November 19, the team participated in one of the first American college football game played in Europe, in the Emerald Isle Classic, played in Dublin, Ireland.

Schedule

References

Boston College
Boston College Eagles football seasons
Boston College Eagles football
Boston College Eagles football